Sindkheda railway station is located near Sindkheda town of Dhule district, Maharashtra. Its code is SNK. It has two platforms. Passenger, MEMU, Express and Superfast trains halt here.

Trains

The following trains halt at Sindkheda railway station in both directions:

 12834/33 Howrah–Ahmedabad Superfast Express
 12655/56 Navjivan Express
 19025/26 Surat–Amravati Express
 19003/04 Khandesh Express
 19045/46 Tapti Ganga Express

References 

Railway stations in Dhule district
Mumbai WR railway division